Brooklyn Hakoah is a former United States soccer team club based in Brooklyn, New York, that played in the American Soccer League.

Brooklyn Hakoah I
Originally formed by former players of SC Hakoah Wien, they played in the  American Soccer League in 1929. They then merged with New York Hakoah of the ESL, to become Hakoah All-Stars.

Year-by-year

Brooklyn Hakoah II
The name was revived during the 1948-49 ASL season when, after just one game, financial trouble caused the owners of the Brooklyn Wanderers to sell the club. New owners took over the team and renamed them the Brooklyn Hakoah. Just before the 1956-–57 season, the club merged with the New York Americans to form a new New York Hakoah.

Year-by-year

American Soccer League (1921–1933) teams
American Soccer League (1933–1983) teams
Brooklyn, Hakoah
Men's soccer clubs in New York (state)
Defunct soccer clubs in New York City
Hakoah sport clubs
Jewish organizations based in the United States
Sports in Brooklyn
Diaspora soccer clubs in the United States